Trachyderes succinctus is a species of beetle in the family Cerambycidae. It was described by Carl Linnaeus in his landmark 1758 10th edition of Systema Naturae.

Description
Trachyderes succinctus can reach a length of about 1 inch (25 mm). Head is reddish or dark brown, or dirty black, and very rough. Antennae are longer than the insect, with the two basal joints blueish black; the rest is red brown, the extremity of each joint being blueish black.

Thorax is reddish or dark brown, shining, and very rough, with large swelling in the middle; having two short thick tubercles on each side. Scutellum is large and long.

Elytra are reddish or dark brown, margined and shining, rather broad at their extremities, and spineless; having a narrow transverse yellow bar in the middle. Abdomen is dark brown. Femora are dark brown at the base, black at the tips. Tibiae and
tarsi are reddish or red brown; the latter cushioned beneath with yellow pile.

Distribution
This species is present in Argentina,Uruguay, Bolivia, Brazil, Costa Rica, Panama, Colombia, Ecuador, Nicaragua, Paraguay, Peru, Venezuela, Suriname, French Guiana, Bolivia and the Antilles.

References

Trachyderini
Beetles described in 1758
Descriptions from Illustrations of Exotic Entomology